Robert Vaughan may refer to:

Politicians
Robert Vaughan (MP for Grampound) (fl. 1554-55), English Member of Parliament for Grampound
Robert Vaughan (MP for New Radnor) (fl. 1524-75 or later), represented New Radnor (UK Parliament constituency)
Sir Robert Vaughan, 2nd Baronet (1768–1843), British Member of Parliament for Merioneth

Others
Bob Vaughan (born 1945), British mathematician
Robert Charles Vaughan (1883–1966), Canadian railway executive
Robert Vaughan (antiquary) (died 1667), Welsh antiquary and manuscript collector
Robert Vaughan (author) (born  1930s), American author
Robert Vaughan (cricketer) (1834-1865), Australian cricketer
Robert Vaughan (minister) (1795–1868), English minister of the Congregationalist communion
Robert Alfred Vaughan (1823–1857), English Congregationalist minister and author, son of Robert Vaughan (1795–1868)
Robert Charles Vaughan (businessman), former Canadian National Railways executive
Robert E. Vaughan (1888–1969), American head football coach for the Wabash College Little Giants
Robert Vaughn (Montana rancher) (Robert Vaughan, 1836–1918), Welsh-American Montanan rancher and pioneer

See also
Robert Vaughan Gorle (1896–1937), British Army officer
Robert Vaughn (disambiguation)
Robert Charles Vaughan (disambiguation)